Kim Elaine Barrett is a research physiologist, specialising in digestive disorders such as inflammatory bowel disease.  She was Distinguished Professor of Medicine and Dean of the Graduate Division at University of California, San Diego before moving to her current position as Vice Dean for Research and Distinguished Professor of Physiology and Membrane Biology in the School of Medicine at University of California, Davis in 2021. She was the Editor-in-Chief of The Journal of Physiology from 2016-2022, and is a Past-President of the American Physiological Society.

Education and career 
Kim is a native of the United Kingdom and earned her BSc in Medicinal Chemistry and her PhD in Biological Chemistry, both from University College London in 1979 and 1982 respectively. She was a post-doctoral fellow at the National Institute for Allergy and Infectious Diseases (Bethesda, MD) in the laboratory of Dean Metcalfe before moving to the University of California San Diego in 1985. She rose to the rank of Distinguished Professor of Medicine and also served two terms as Dean of the Graduate Division there.  From 2020-21, she additionally served as the rotating Director of the Division of Graduate Education in the Education and Human Resources Directorate of the National Science Foundation in Alexandria, VA.  In November 2021, she became Vice-Dean for Research and Distinguished Professor of Physiology and Membrane Biology at the University of California Davis School of Medicine.  

Her research focuses on the transport and barrier properties of the gastrointestinal epithelium and how these are deranged in the setting of various disease processes. Her work is relevant to the understanding of diarrheal diseases, particularly those caused by infectious agents such as Salmonella, and also to the mechanism of action of probiotics.  She has also been interested in topics of diversity and inclusion in graduate education and in academic settings more broadly.

Selected publications
She is the lead author for Ganong's Review of Medical Physiology (McGraw-Hill), currently in its 26th edition, and sole author of Gastrointestinal Physiology, also published by McGraw-Hill. Other highly-cited publications include:

Awards 
She has received numerous honours for her research, teaching, mentoring and service activities. For example, she received the degree of Doctor of Medical Science, honoris causa, from Queen's University Belfast in 2004, and the Bodil Schmidt-Nielsen Distinguished Scientist and Mentor Award from the American Physiological Society in 2012.  She was also the 2015 Bayliss-Starling Prize Lecturer of The Physiological Society. In 2021, she received the Distinguished Achievement Award in Basic Science from the American Gastroenterological Association.

References

External links 

, February 16, 2016

American physiologists
Women physiologists
University of California, San Diego faculty
The Journal of Physiology editors
Alumni of University College London
Living people
Women medical researchers
Year of birth missing (living people)